Óscar Bitar Haddad (born 16 July 1942) is a Mexican politician affiliated with the Institutional Revolutionary Party. As of 2014 he served as Deputy of the LIX Legislature of the Mexican Congress representing Hidalgo, and previously served as municipal president of Tulancingo.

References

1942 births
Living people
Politicians from Hidalgo (state)
Institutional Revolutionary Party politicians
People from Tulancingo
Municipal presidents in Hidalgo (state)
20th-century Mexican politicians
21st-century Mexican politicians
Deputies of the LIX Legislature of Mexico
Members of the Chamber of Deputies (Mexico) for Hidalgo (state)